Thomas Allchurch (24 April 1883 – 23 October 1934) was an English cricketer who played three first-class games for Worcestershire in 1919 and 1920.

He made his first-class debut in late June 1919 against Gloucestershire at New Road, and performed well, scoring 51 (his only fifty) and taking 4/76 in the first innings.
The following month, also at New Road, he had an unsuccessful time (5 and 7; 23-2-114-1) in a crushing innings-and-203-run defeat against the Australian Imperial Forces.
Finally, in August 1920 he played against Lancashire at Stourbridge. Although Worcestershire again lost by an innings, Allchurch's 5/70 was the best bowling return of his short career.

Notes

References
 
 

English cricketers
Worcestershire cricketers
1883 births
1934 deaths
Sportspeople from Stourbridge